Grindle Rock is a conspicuous rock,  high, lying  west of Bristol Island in the South Sandwich Islands. It was discovered by a British expedition under James Cook in 1775. It was recharted in 1930 by Discovery Investigations personnel on the Discovery II and named by them for Sir Gilbert E.A. Grindle, Permanent Under-Secretary of State for the British Colonies.

Grindle Rock is the easternmost of a chain of rocks extending WSW from Turmoil Point, the westernmost point of Bristol Island. These are Grindle Rock, Wilson Rock and Freezland Rock.

References

Rock formations of South Georgia and the South Sandwich Islands